Argentina competed at the 1972 Summer Olympics in Munich, West Germany. 92 competitors, 88 men and 4 women, took part in 62 events in 12 sports.

Medalists

Athletics

Men

Women

Boxing

Cycling

Eight cyclists represented Argentina in 1972.

Road race, time trial

Sprint

Pursuit

Equestrian

Eventing

Show jumping

Fencing

Field hockey

Ernesto BarreirosFernando CalpJulio César CufreFlavio de GiacomiGerardo LorenzoLuis Antonio CostaHéctor MarinoniOsvaldo Monti

Jorge PiccioliDaniel PortuguésAlfredo QuaquariniHoracio RognoniAlberto SabbioneJorge SabbioneGabriel ScallyOvidio Sodor

Group play

 Qualified for semifinals

Judo

Rowing

Sailing

Shooting

Five male shooters represented Argentina in 1972.

Swimming

Wrestling

Men's freestyle

Men's Greco-Roman

Key

DQ – Won/lost by passivity.
TF – Won/lost by fall.
P – Won/lost by points.

References

Nations at the 1972 Summer Olympics
1972 Summer Olympics
1972 in Argentine sport